Robert Burrell, is a Canadian biomedical engineer, currently the Canada Research Chair at University of Alberta.

Burrell was inducted into the Alberta Order of Excellence on October 17, 2019.

References

Year of birth missing (living people)
Living people
Academic staff of the University of Alberta
Canadian biomedical engineers
Members of the Alberta Order of Excellence